The Canongate is a district in Edinburgh, Scotland.

Canongate may also refer to:

 Canongate Books, a publisher
 A district in Jedburgh, Scotland
 Canongate Myth Series, a series of short novels